John Fraser (March 4, 1912 – June 28, 1981) was a Canadian politician. He served in the Legislative Assembly of New Brunswick as member of the Liberal party from 1948 to 1952.

References

1912 births
1981 deaths
New Brunswick Liberal Association MLAs
British emigrants to Canada